Events from the year 1616 in France

Incumbents
 Monarch – Louis XIII

Events
3 May – Treaty of Loudun

Births

Full date missing
Sébastien Bourdon, painter and engraver (died 1671)
Anne Gonzaga, noblewoman and salonist (died 1684)
Henri Testelin, painter (died 1695)

Deaths

Full date missing
Pierre de Gondi, bishop and cardinal (born 1533)
Nicholas Rémy, magistrate, hunter (born 1530)
Pierre-Olivier Malherbe, explorer (born 1569)
Florence Rivault, mathematician (born 1571)
Sylvestre de Laval, Roman Catholic theologian (born 1570)

See also

References

1610s in France